Donald Mann House is a historic home located at Scottsville, Monroe County, New York. It was built about 1830, and is a two-story, Late Federal stone farmhouse with a -story side wing.  It has a garage addition and stone porch (now enclosed) added about 1900.  Also on the property is a contributing stone outbuilding.

It was listed on the National Register of Historic Places in 2013.

References

Houses on the National Register of Historic Places in New York (state)
Federal architecture in New York (state)
Houses completed in 1830
Buildings and structures in Monroe County, New York
National Register of Historic Places in Monroe County, New York